Thresholds is the second full-length studio album from Florida death metal band Nocturnus. It was released in 1992 by Earache Records.

Thresholds continued the experimental sound created on the first album and the line-up was expanded to a six-piece with the addition of vocalist Dan Izzo, allowing Mike Browning to concentrate solely on drums. Lyrical topics range from Earth's climate and global warming ("Climate Controller"), primitive religions ("Tribal Vodoun"), underwater species ("Aquatica") and extraterrestrial life ("Gridzone").

The production of Thresholds is considerably more polished than that of The Key. The music is also more complex and mature, with there being numerous breakdowns and tempo changes in every song. The band's musicianship has also advanced with each member exhibiting a new level of preciseness and technicality, with complex riffing and melodic solos. Dan Izzo's vocals are much deeper and clearer than Browning's and have been compared to the vocals of Max Cavalera of Sepultura.

"Alter Reality" was released as a single and featured a music video that received substantial airplay on MTV's Headbangers Ball. "Arctic Crypt" and "Climate Controller" also became notable fan favorites.

This was the last Nocturnus release to feature founding member Mike Browning, who was forcibly ejected shortly after its release. The remaining band members subsequently trademarked the Nocturnus name, preventing Browning from performing under the band's name or any of their music.

Track listing

Credits
 Dan Izzo - vocals
 Mike Davis - lead guitar, rhythm guitar
 Sean McNenney - lead guitar, rhythm guitar
 Chris Anderson - bass guitar
 Louis Panzer - keyboards
 Mike Browning - drums, percussion
 Recorded in December, 1991 at Morrisound Recording, Tampa, Florida, USA
 Produced by Tom Morris and Nocturnus

References

External links
Earache Records album entry
Discogs album entry
Encyclopaedia Metallum album entry
BNR Metal discography page
Nocturnus fan site

1992 albums
Nocturnus albums
Earache Records albums
Albums recorded at Morrisound Recording